Sienno may refer to the following places:
Sienno, Słupca County in Greater Poland Voivodeship (west-central Poland)
Sienno, Kuyavian-Pomeranian Voivodeship (north-central Poland)
Sienno, Masovian Voivodeship (east-central Poland)
Sienno, Wągrowiec County in Greater Poland Voivodeship (west-central Poland)
Sienno, Lubusz Voivodeship (west Poland)
Sienno, West Pomeranian Voivodeship (north-west Poland)